A torpedo bulkhead is a type of naval armour common on the more heavily armored warships, especially battleships and battlecruisers of the early 20th century. It is designed to keep the ship afloat even if the hull is struck underneath the belt armor by a shell or by a torpedo.

History 
After the lessons learned during World War I, many capital ships were refitted with double, triple, or even quadruple torpedo bulkheads, as well as anti-torpedo bulges to the exterior of the hull. For example, the last US battleship designs during World War II had up to four torpedo bulkheads and a triple-bottom. 

The innermost bulkhead is commonly referred to as the holding bulkhead, and often this bulkhead would be manufactured from high tensile steel that could deform and absorb the pressure pulse from a torpedo hit without breaking. If the final bulkhead was at least 37 mm thick, it may also be referred to as an armored bulkhead, as it would be capable of stopping splinters and shells with low striking velocities.

Footnotes

References

Naval armour